The women's mass start race of the 2014–15 ISU Speed Skating World Cup 3, arranged in Sportforum Hohenschönhausen, in Berlin, Germany, was held on 7 December 2014.

Irene Schouten of the Netherlands won the race, while Ivanie Blondin of Canada came second, and Jun Ye-jin of South Korea came third.

Results
The race took place on Sunday, 7 December, scheduled in the afternoon session, at 15:44.

References

Women mass start
3